Ervin Ryta (born August 9, 1978) is an Albanian former footballer who played in the Western Ontario Soccer League, USL A-League, and the Canadian Professional Soccer League.

Club career 
Ryta arrived to Canada in 1995 after participating in an Albanian youth tournament hosted in Canada. He remained in Canada to play with London Croatia in the Western Ontario Soccer League. In 1997, he went south of the border to sign with Minnesota Thunder in the USL A-League. The following season, he returned to London Croatia for another season. Within a year he was back in the A-League with the Toronto Lynx, and made his debut on May 15, 1999 against the Rochester Raging Rhinos.

In 2000, he signed with Toronto Croatia of the Canadian Professional Soccer League. He made his debut on July 9, 2000 against the North York Astros. He featured in the CPSL Championship final against Toronto Olympians, where Croatia won the title by a score of 2-1. He returned to Toronto Lynx for the 2001 season, where he appeared in 8 matches. In 2003, he returned to the CPSL for another stint with London City.

References 

1978 births
Living people
Association football defenders
Albanian footballers
Minnesota Thunder players
Toronto Lynx players
Toronto Croatia players
London City players
A-League (1995–2004) players
Canadian Soccer League (1998–present) players
Albanian expatriate footballers
Expatriate soccer players in Canada
Albanian expatriate sportspeople in Canada
Expatriate soccer players in the United States
Albanian expatriate sportspeople in the United States